Fusiona is a genus of the family Fusionidae in the phylum Apicomplexa

Taxonomy

There is one species - Fusiona geusi - in this genus. This species infects bees.

History

This genus was created in 1965 by Stejskal.

Description

Species in this family are homoxenous.

Gametocytes - not described

Spores - not described

Both gamonts and trophozoites are septate. The gamonts are morphologically different (anisogamous).

Sexual reproduction involves a cephalocaudal association. During syzygy the nucleus and entrocyte of the satellite move to the primite where they fuse.

References

Apicomplexa genera
Parasites of bees